Motal Selsoviet is a rural council in the territory of the Ivanava District, Brest Region of Belarus.

The administrative center is Motal. , chairman of selsoviet is a Sergey Pilipovich.

Composition 
 Motal (Capital)
 Tyškavičy

History 
October 12, 1940 established Dedavitski Selsoviet as part of the Ivanava District Pinsk area.
July 16, 1954 the village council renamed the Motal.

External links 
 Ivanovo Regional Executive Committee
 Localities of the Republic of Belarus
 RB Postal Codes

Ivanava District